The second season of Ang Probinsyano, a Philippine action drama television series on ABS-CBN, premiered on October 3, 2016, on the network's Primetime Bida evening block and worldwide on The Filipino Channel and concluded on May 25, 2017. The series stars Coco Martin as SPO2 Ricardo Dalisay, together with an ensemble cast consisting of Susan Roces, Arjo Atayde, Albert Martinez, Agot Isidro, Jaime Fabregas, and Eddie Garcia. 

The second season of Ang Probinsyano shows the Tuazon family's façade slowly unravel, leading their conflict with Cardo to become even more direct than it was when they were shrouded in anonymity. The Tuazons then succeed in smearing Cardo's name by securing his conviction for drug trafficking. Cardo would later escape and find incriminating evidence against the Tuazons, and along the way exonerating himself. In his search for justice, Cardo also uncovers the Tuazons involvement in the demise of his father, brother and sister-in-law.

Plot 
Tomas Tuazon (Albert Martinez), Joaquin's (Arjo Atayde) father, is revealed as the head of the drug syndicate Cardo (Coco Martin) battles. Don Emilio Syquia (Eddie Garcia), Tomas' father-in-law, gets fed up with Tomas taking control of the drug syndicate for himself and orchestrates events that would pit Cardo against Tomas. Tomas is ultimately captured by Cardo in a drug sting, and is subsequently convicted. To retaliate, Joaquin and Don Emilio frame Cardo for illegal drug possession. While inside the maximum security prison, Cardo and Tomas continue to engage in conflicts, which further intensifies when Don Emilio reveals the truth to Cardo that Tomas killed Cardo's former sister-in-law, Carmen (Bela Padilla). As Tomas attempts to escape prison, Cardo kills him.

Following Tomas' death, Joaquin and General Rogelio Jacob (Rez Cortez) hire a new, even more cruel Bureau of Corrections Director, Guillermo Acosta (Dindo Arroyo). Under their payroll, Acosta makes prison life more difficult for Cardo. Cardo participates in a jailbreak and is determined to clear his name. He continues to pursue the syndicate responsible for his frame up. To that end, using the name of Miguel, he joins his allies in prison Ramil "Manager" Taduran (Michael de Mesa) and Julian Valerio (Julio Diaz) who work for the Cebu-based drug syndicate of Romano "Chairman" Recio (Ronnie Lazaro), an ally of Joaquin, to take the syndicate down.

The organization continues to threaten his family and has many connections in society, including the police and government. Unknown to Cardo, the syndicate who framed him is the same syndicate responsible for the deaths of his loved ones, including Ador.

Don Emilio is captured by Cardo and convicted for the murder of Cardo's father, SPO4 Pablo B. de Leon (Tonton Gutierrez). Cardo and his prison allies take down Recio's drug syndicate and after surrendering, Cardo's innocence is proven after Joaquin is exposed for his crimes. Cardo obtains incriminating evidence including Colonel Roy Carreon's (Art Acuña) testimony that he previously secretly worked for Joaquin. Joaquin is exposed as Ador's murderer and for his part in covering up and leading a drug and human trafficking syndicate.

Cardo kills Joaquin after the latter disrupts his wedding to Alyana (Yassi Pressman), finally avenging his twin's death.

Cast and characters 

Main cast
 Coco Martin as SPO2 Ricardo "Cardo" Dalisay
 Agot Isidro as Verna Syquia-Tuazon
 Jaime Fábregas as PC/Supt. Delfin S. Borja
 Arjo Atayde as PC/Insp. Joaquin S. Tuazon
 Bela Padilla as Carmen M. Guzman
 Albert Martinez as Tomas "Papa Tom" G. Tuazon
 Susan Roces as Kapitana Flora "Lola Kap" S. Borja-de Leon
 Eddie Garcia as Don Emilio Syquia

Recurring cast
 Malou Crisologo as Yolanda "Yolly" Capuyao-Santos
 Beverly Salviejo as "Yaya" Cita Roque 
 Pepe Herrera as Benjamin "Benny" Dimaapi
 Marvin Yap as Elmo Santos
 Art Acuña as PS/Supt. Roy Carreon
 John Medina as PS/Insp. Avel "Billy" M. Guzman
 Lester Llansang as PS/Insp. Mark Vargas
 John Prats as SPO3 Jerome Girona, Jr.
 Michael Roy Jornales as PS/Insp. Francisco "Chikoy" Rivera
 Marc Acueza as PS/Insp. Bernardino "Dino" Robles
 Rino Marco as PS/Insp. Gregorio "Greg" Sebastian 
 Marc Solis as SPO1 Rigor Soriano
 Yassi Pressman as Alyana R. Arevalo-Dalisay
 Benj Manalo as Felipe "Pinggoy" Tanyag, Jr.
 Joel Torre as Teodoro "Teddy" Arevalo
 Shamaine Centenera-Buencamino as Virginia "Virgie" R. Arevalo
 McCoy de Leon as Juan Pablo "JP" R. Arevalo
 Elisse Joson as Lorraine Pedrosa 
 Lander Vera Perez as Alfred Borromeo
 Kiray Celis as Mitch 
 Simon Ezekiel Pineda as Honorio "Onyok" Amaba
 McNeal "Awra" Briguela as Macario "Makmak" Samonte, Jr.
 James "Paquito" Sagarino as Paquito Alvarado
 Rhian "Dang" Ramos as Amanda "Dang" Ignacio
 Shantel Crislyn Layh "Ligaya" Ngujo as Ligaya Dungalo
 Lei Andrei Navarro as Dominador "Junior" G. de Leon, Jr.
 Dennis Padilla as Edgar Guzman
 Ana Roces as Leonora "Nora" Montano-Guzman
 Brace Arquiza as Ryan M. Guzman
 Daisy Reyes as Belen Girona

Guest cast

Episodes

Notes

References

External links

2016 Philippine television seasons
2017 Philippine television seasons